Fileski (born in Madiun, East Java, February 21, 1988) Since sitting in elementary school he already writing poetry, inspired by the poetry of his father, a teacher Indonesian language and literature. Various literary appreciation stage national and international level has achieved. Fileski establish Literature Music Community. He is also a composer who created many musical compositions inspired from the works of poetry, short stories, and novels. His poems published in various newspapers, magazines, journals, bulletins, and cross-country poet poetry anthology. Graduates of arts degree from the Wilwatikta Arts University of Surabaya took specifications Theatre Arts department. Fileski also often referred to as the "Poet Violinist", because the typical dish Poetry violin performances and expressive style and the attractive stage. Over the past three years, Fileski often embellish a variety of national and international literary event. Noted as a record-breaking 11 Hours Nonstop Poems collaborated with 257 Readers Poetry (2012), Poetry Music album release together Paperland - Togamas Music Production (2013), Violin Recital Tour Poetry - Language Month Singapore (2014), Award Winning Anugerah Hescom Musikalisasi Puisi e-Sastra Malaysia (2014).

References 

 poet-musician-Indonesia-can-award-from-Malaysia
 poet-Indonesia-Malaysia-reach-award-e-literature
 Fileski-poet-musician-Accept-award-from-Malaysia
 activists-musical-poetry-Indonesia-can-awards-in-Malaysia
 some poems fileski
 fileski-break-record-play-music-11-hour-non-stop
 fileski-release-song-titled first-steps-to-class-inspiring
  poetry-the-hero-Fileski
 collection of poetry-fileski
 poetry-fileski

1988 births
Living people
21st-century Indonesian poets
Indonesian violinists
Indonesian male poets
Indonesian composers
21st-century male writers
21st-century violinists